Poul Jørgensen may refer to:
 Poul Jørgensen (gymnast) (1892–1973), Danish gymnast
 Poul Jørgensen (conductor) (1934–2003), Danish conductor
 Poul Jørgensen (chemist) (born 1944), Danish chemist

See also
 Paul Jorgensen (1935–2008), boxer from Louisiana
 Paul Lindemark Jørgensen (1916–1988), Danish Olympic sailor